Konya Food and Agriculture University (KFAU) (Konya Gıda ve Tarım Üniversitesi, KGTÜ) is a private university in Konya, Turkey.  It is Turkey's first specialized university in food and agriculture.

KFAU was founded in 2013 by the Scientific Research Technology Education and Culture Foundation (Bilimsel Araştırma Teknoloji Eğitim ve Kültür Vakfı, BARTEK).

KFAU has faculties in agriculture and natural science, engineering and architecture, and social and human sciences.

Academic units

Faculty of Agriculture and Natural Sciences

Departments located within the faculty;

 Crop Production and Technologies
 Animal Production and Technologies
 Molecular Biology and Genetics
 Genetics and Breeding

Faculty of Engineering and Architecture

Departments located within the faculty;

 The Food Engineering
 Materials Engineering
 Bioengineering
 Computer Engineering
 Electrical Engineering
 Industrial Engineering

Faculty of Social and Human Sciences

Departments located within the faculty;

 International Finance and Economics 
 International Trade and Business 
 Psychology 
 Sociology

References

External links 
 

Agricultural universities and colleges
Private universities and colleges in Turkey